The Myakka River is a river in southwestern Florida. It arises near the Hardee-Manatee county line and flows southwest and then southeast through Manatee, Sarasota and Charlotte counties to Charlotte Harbor, an arm of the Gulf of Mexico. The last  of the river is tidal and brackish.

The Myakka River remains relatively undeveloped. A  stretch of the river is preserved in Myakka River State Park. A  portion of the river in Sarasota County (including all of the park) was designated as a state Wild and Scenic River in 1985 by the Florida Legislature. Portions of the ancient water basin, however, have been altered by canals. In 2022, the river flooding during Hurricane Ian resulted in the temporary closing of 14 miles of Interstate 75 near Port Charlotte.

Tributaries
Myakkahatchee Creek

See also
Deer Prairie Creek Preserve

References

 Dorsey, Tim and Barry, Rick. 1990. Myakka River. in Marth, Del and Marty Marth, eds. The Rivers of Florida. Sarasota, Florida: Pineapple Press, Inc. .

Rivers of Charlotte County, Florida
Rivers of Manatee County, Florida
Rivers of Florida
Rivers of Sarasota County, Florida
Outstanding Florida Waters